Alvin H. Nielsen (30 May 1910 – 3 November 1994) was an American physicist in molecular spectroscopy.

Life
Nielsen was born in Menominee, Michigan. He graduated from the University of Michigan, taught at the Ohio State University, and then relocated to the University of Tennessee in 1935. He spent 1951 to 1952 at the Astrophysical Institute in Liège. Nielsen achieved widespread recognition for his work in spectroscopy and wrote eighty-five publications. He served as chairman of the physics department at the University of Tennessee. He was the brother of Harald Herborg Nielsen.

Honors
In 1980, the University of Tennessee at Knoxville named its physics building the Alvin H. Nielsen Physics Building in Nielsen's honor.

References

External links
Alvin Andreas Herborg Nielsen, Tennessee Encyclopedia of History and Culture.

1910 births
1994 deaths
20th-century American physicists
People from Menominee, Michigan
American people of Danish descent
University of Michigan alumni
Fellows of the American Physical Society